Bojkovice is a town in Uherské Hradiště District in the Zlín Region of the Czech Republic. It has about 4,300 inhabitants.

Administrative parts
Villages of Bzová, Krhov and Přečkovice are administrative parts of Bojkovice.

Geography
The built-up area of Bojkovice lies in the Olšava River valley.

The northern part of the municipal territory lies in the Vizovice Highlands, the southern part lies in the White Carpathians. The almost entire territory lies in the White Carpathians Protected Landscape Area.

History
The first written mention of Bojkovice is from 1362. It was promoted to a market town in 1449. In the 16th century, Bojkovice was attacked and plundered by the Hungarians, bringing periods of famine.

The 19th century brought greater prosperity, as railroads and electrical grids entered the area. During World War II, it was occupied by Nazi Germany, who converted the local factory to war-materials production.

The town received the town statute in 1965.

Sights

The main attraction is the Nový Světlov Castle. The original fort was built in the 1480s to protect the town from the attacks of Hungarians. In the second half of the 19th century, it was converted into a castle in the Tudor neo-Gothic style.

The parish Church of Saint Lawrence is an early Baroque building from the 17th century.

In the town there is also the Bojskovsko Museum, focused on local folklore and traditions.

Notable people
Karel Urbánek (born 1941), politician

Twin towns – sister cities

Bojkovice is twinned with:
 Trenčianska Turná, Slovakia

References

External links

Tourist portal of the Moravian Slovakia region

Cities and towns in the Czech Republic
Populated places in Uherské Hradiště District
Moravian Slovakia